São Raimundo Esporte Clube, commonly referred to as São Raimundo de Roraima, São Raimundo-RR or simply São Raimundo is a Brazilian professional club based in Boa Vista, Roraima founded on 2 January 1963. It competes in the Campeonato Brasileiro Série D, the fourth tier of Brazilian football, as well as in the Campeonato Roraimense, the top flight of the Roraima state football league.

São Raimundo is the top ranked team from Roraima in CBF's national club ranking, being placed 78th overall.

History
São Raimundo was founded in 1963. The club is the third most champion of the state of Roraima, with 7 titles.

Stadium
São Raimundo play their home games at Estádio Ribeirão. The stadium has a maximum capacity of 3,000 people.

Honours
 Campeonato Roraimense
 Winners (13): 1977, 1992, 2004, 2005, 2012, 2014, 2016, 2017, 2018, 2019, 2020, 2021, 2022

References

External links
 São Raimundo in OGol.com

Association football clubs established in 1963
Football clubs in Roraima
1963 establishments in Brazil